The Beatles Illustrated Lyrics is a set of two books combining the lyrics of songs by the Beatles with accompanying illustrations and photographs, many by leading artists of the period. Comments from the Beatles on the origins of the songs are also included. The book was edited by Alan Aldridge, who also provided many of the illustrations. The books were published in the UK  by Macdonald Unit 75 (later Macdonald & Co) in 1969 and 1971, and in the US by Delacorte Press/Seymour Lawrence. The book was reprinted as one volume in 1999 by Black Dog & Leventhal, and in a signed limited edition in 2012. Some of the illustrations were fan art solicited by Aldridge.

The book focuses almost exclusively on the lyrics to songs written by Lennon-McCartney and for reasons unclear, not all of the songs written by George Harrison are included, let alone the two songs written by Richard Starkey (AKA Ringo Starr). The book doesn't include the lyrics to the many cover versions of songs recorded for EMI.

Artists
Artists and photographers featured in the book (Part I) include:
Julian Allen
Clive Arrowsmith
David Bailey
Stephen Bobroff
Mel Calman
Seymour Chwast
John Deakin
Erté
John Farman
Hans Feurer
Folon
Milton Glaser
John Glashan
Rick Griffin
Robert Grossman
Chadwick Hall
Rudolf Hausner
David Hockney
Art Kane
David King
Roger Law
Peter Le Vasseur
James Lloyd
Jean Loup Sieff
Brian Love
Peter Max
James Marsh
Mike McInnerney
David Montgomery
Phillipe Mora
Victor Moscoso
Stanley Mouse
Ronald Searle
Donald Silverstein
Diane Tipple
Harri Peccinotti
Colette Portal
Enzo Ragazzini
Ethan Russell
Justin Todd
Roland Topor
Tomi Ungerer
Richard Weigand
Harry Willock

Artists and photographers featured in the book (Part II) include:
John Alcorn ("Eight Days a Week")
David Bailey ("Lovely Rita")
R. O. Blechman ("No Reply")
Charles Bragg ("I Call Your Name")
Mel Calman ("Only a Northern Song")
Seymour Chwast ("The Continuing Story of Bungalow Bill")
Alan E. Cober ("From Me to You")
John Deakin ("P.S. I Love You")
Étienne Delessert ("Bad to Me")
Heinz Edelmann (numerous)
Erté ("Goodnight")
Michael English ("Another Girl")
Michael Foreman ("And I Love Her")
Milton Glaser ("A Day in the Life")
John Glashan ("Can't Buy Me Love")
Rick Griffin ("Why Don't We Do It in the Road?")
Robert Grossman ("Back in the U.S.S.R.")
Rudolf Hausner ("Magical Mystery Tour")
David Hockney ("I'm So Tired")
Nigel Holmes ("Her Majesty")
Allen Jones ("Girl")
Art Kane ("Eleanor Rigby")
Jan Lenica ("All My Loving")
James Marsh ("Michelle")
Peter Max ("Glass Onion"), ("The Word")
James McMullan ("I Feel Fine")
Tony Meeuwissen ("Hello, Little Girl")
Philippe Mora ("Carry that Weight")
Victor Moscoso ("Ob-La-Di, Ob-La-Da")
Stanley Mouse ("The Inner Light")
Barbara Nessim ("I'll Be Back")
Eduardo Paolozzi ("Let It Be")
Ethan Russell ("Got to Get You into My Life")
Ronald Searle ("Help!")
Jean Loup Sieff ("Good Day Sunshine")
Ralph Steadman ("Oh! Darling")
Tiger Tateishi ("That Means a Lot"), ("Wait")
Roland Topor ("Sgt. Pepper's Lonely Hearts Club Band")
Tomi Ungerer ("All I've Got to Do"), ("Fixing a Hole")
David Vaughan ("Because")
Tadanori Yokoo ("I'll Cry Instead")
Michael Leonard  ( When I'm Sixty Four )

References
The Beatles Illustrated Lyrics, edited by Alan Aldridge. Black Dog & Leventhal/Workman (1999) 

Illustrated Lyrics
Lyrics
1969 books
Houghton Mifflin books